Cyclophora nigrescens is a moth in the family Geometridae. It is found in Peru.

The larvae feed on Myrciaria dubia.

References

Moths described in 1993
Cyclophora (moth)
Moths of South America